Richard Lloyd "Ricky" Evans (born 23 June 1960) is a former Welsh international rugby union player.

History
Born in Aberporth Cardigan in West Wales in 1960, Ricky Evans played most of his club rugby for Llanelli RFC playing in the victorious side which beat the touring Wallabies who were then World Champions. He was capped 19 times by Wales playing at loose head prop.

His debut was against England at Cardiff Arms Park in 1993, a game which Wales won 10-9. In 1994 he played in the Five Nations winning Welsh team although losing to England in the final game at Twickenham a try was on the cards for Ricky, however a desperate tap tackle by Dewi Morris prevented a certain score, however retaining the ball and making it available Nigel Walker scored the vital try in the corner to reduce the points difference and secure the title for Wales.

Despite a serious ankle injury sustained in the Five Nations match against France in Paris in January 1995, he recovered fitness and went on to play in the 1995 World Cup against New Zealand and Ireland.

History was made in the French courts when Ricky sued Olivier Merle the French lock who had caused the injury through foul play. For the first time video evidence (of the game) was accepted in a French Court. The match had been taped by his father and proved to be the turning point in the trial.

Injury cut short what was a promising career at international level which may well have resulted in selection for the British & Irish Lions 1997 squad to tour South Africa.

He finished his playing career with Cardigan RFC and has played in the Bermuda Veterans Tournament being on the winning "British Lions" side against New Zealand.

Personal life
Ricky Evans is a convert to Buddhism.

References 

1960 births
Living people
Converts to Buddhism
Llanelli RFC players
Rugby union players from Ceredigion
Rugby union props
Wales international rugby union players
Welsh Buddhists
Welsh rugby union players